The Province of 11 Szepes Towns was a seat, an autonomous administrative division, within Szepes County, Kingdom of Hungary. It was established on 8 November 1412, with the Spiš Pledge, in which Hungary had pledged part of Szepes County to the Kingdom of Poland, with the Province of 24 Szepes Towns was divided into Province of 11 Szepes Towns in Hungary, and Province of 13 Spisz Towns in Poland. It ceased to exist in 1465 when its autonomy was discontinued, with its territories being given back under the administration of Szepes County. Its seat was in Spišský Štvrtok.

Towns 
 Spišský Štvrtok
 Iliašovce
 Žakovce
 Hrabušice
 Kurimany
 Mlynica
 Veľký Slavkov
 Odorín
 Bystrany
 Vlkovce
 Harichovce

Citations

Notes

References

Bibliography 
 Zuzanna Krempaská, Sixteen Scepus Towns from 1412 to 1876. Spišska Nova Vés, Spiš Museum. ISBN 9788085173062.
 Encyklopédia Slovenska, Bratislava, 1980.
 Julia Radziszewska, Studia spiskie. Katowice. 1985.
 Terra Scepusiensis. Stan badań nad dziejami Spiszu. Lewocza-Wrocław. 2003.

Province of 11 Szepes Towns
Province of 11 Szepes Towns
Province of 11 Szepes Towns
Province of 11 Szepes Towns
 15th-century establishments in Europe
 15th-century disestablishments in Europe
 States and territories established in 1412
 States and territories disestablished in 1465